Main Squeeze is the fifth, all instrumental studio album by jazz flugelhorn player Chuck Mangione. The album was only briefly released on Compact Disc in the late 80's but discontinued not long after, making it for many years a rare find.  However, it was finally reissued in 2018 as part of a budget five original albums set. It features one of Chuck Mangione's most popular songs, "Main Squeeze" and a supporting cast of several of NYC's finest sessions musicians of the day.

Track listing
All songs written by Chuck Mangione except where noted:

Musicians
 Chuck Mangione - Flugelhorn, Fender Rhodes
 Tony Levin - Bass
 Rubens Bassini - Percussion
 Steve Gadd - Drums, Percussion
 Ralph MacDonald - Percussion
 Don Grolnick - Acoustic Piano, Fender Rhodes
 Richard Tee - Organ
 John Tropea - Electric & Acoustic Guitars
 Bob Mann - Electric & Acoustic Guitars
 Gene Orloff - Concertmaster
 Bob Carlisle, Fred Griffen, Jimmy Buffington, John Clarke - French Horns
 Bill Watrous, David Taylor, Tom Malone, Wayne Andre - Trombones
 Alan Rubin, Jeff Tkazyik, Jon Faddis, Lew Soloff - Trumpets

Personnel
 Ian Patrick - Photography 
 Roland Young - Art Direction
 Tom Iannaccone - Management 
 Junie Osaki - Design

References

External links
 http://www.discogs.com/Chuck-Mangione-Main-Squeeze/release/1160022

1976 albums
Chuck Mangione albums
A&M Records albums
Albums recorded at Electric Lady Studios